The Pan-Armenian National Agreement, sometimes called the All-Armenian National Consensus is an Armenian political alliance.

History
The alliance was founded on 22 June 2019 and consists of the Hayk Party, the Christian People's Revival Party, the Nzhdehian Tseghakron Party, and the Social Justice Party. The alliance does not have any representation within the National Assembly and currently acts as an extra-parliamentary force.

During the 2020−2021 Armenian protests, the alliance called for the resignation of Prime Minister Nikol Pashinyan and for free elections to follow. The alliance is against holding the 2021 Armenian constitutional referendum and opposes any of the former leaders of Armenia, including Robert Kocharyan and Serzh Sargsyan, of returning to power.

Ideology
The alliance believes in direct democracy, abolishing the Presidency, strengthening the sovereignty of Armenia, continuing the economic development of the country, establishing independent media, making university education free of charge, encouraging repatriation of the Armenian Diaspora, protecting rights of ethnic minorities, supports the concept of Wilsonian Armenia and the unification of Artsakh with Armenia. The alliance also opposes same-sex marriage and the operation of foreign military bases in the country.

Leadership
Leadership of the alliance consists of a Political Council, led by Arthur Babayan, and includes:
 Artyom Khachikyan, Chairman of the Hayk Party
 George Hovsepyan, President of the Nzhdehian Tseghakron Party
 Mkrtich Gimishyan, President of the Christian People's Revival Party

See also

 Programs of political parties in Armenia

References

External links
Pan-Armenian National Agreement on Facebook

2020 establishments in Armenia
Centrist parties in Asia
Centrist parties in Europe
Conservative parties in Armenia
Political parties established in 2019
Political party alliances in Armenia
Social conservative parties